The Honeydrippers were an English rock and roll band of the 1980s, deriving their name from Roosevelt Sykes, an American blues singer also known as "Honeydripper". Former Led Zeppelin lead singer Robert Plant formed the group in 1981 to satisfy his long-time goal of having a rock band with a heavy rhythm and blues basis. Formed originally in Worcestershire, the band was also composed of fellow former Led Zeppelin member Jimmy Page; Jeff Beck (a former Yardbirds member like Page); and other friends and well-known studio musicians including original Judas Priest guitarist Ernest Chataway. The band released only one recording, an EP titled The Honeydrippers: Volume One, on 12 November 1984.

The Honeydrippers peaked at number 3 in early 1985 on the Billboard Hot 100 with a remake of the Phil Phillips' tune "Sea of Love", and hit number 25 with "Rockin' at Midnight", originally a Roy Brown recording and a rewrite of "Good Rockin' Tonight."  With the EP's success, Plant stated that a full album would be recorded, but it never was.

Members
Original lineup (1981)
Robert Plant – vocals
Andy Silvester – guitar
Kevin O'Neill – drums
Ricky Cool – harmonica
Jim Hickman – bass
Keith Evans – saxophone
Wayne Terry – bass
Robbie Blunt – guitar

The Honeydrippers: Volume One lineup (1984)
Robert Plant – vocals
Jimmy Page – guitars
Jeff Beck – guitars
Paul Shaffer – keyboard
Nile Rodgers – guitar, co-producer
Wayne Pedzwater – bass
Dave Weckl – drums
Brian Setzer – guitar (guest appearance)
 Keith "Bev" Smith – drums

Discography
The Honeydrippers: Volume One (1984), US number 5, US R&B number 67, UK number 56

References

External links

Atlantic Records artists
British rock music groups
Jimmy Page
Robert Plant
Musical groups established in 1981
Musical groups disestablished in 1985
Rock music supergroups
1981 establishments in England
1985 disestablishments in England